K. T. Francis, full name Kandiah Thirugnansampandapillai Francis (15 October 1939 – 9 June 2013) was a Sri Lankan cricket umpire. Francis officiated in 25 Tests and 56 One Day Internationals between 1982 and 1999, mostly in his own country. 

Francis' first Test as umpire was the one-off  Test between Sri Lanka and England in February 1982; this was the first recognised Test match played by Sri Lanka. Three days earlier, Francis made his debut as a One Day International umpire, in a match that also featured the debut of future Sri Lankan cricket captain Arjuna Ranatunga. 

K. T. Francis was married and has two children.

See also
 List of Test cricket umpires
 List of One Day International cricket umpires

References

External links
K. T. Francis Cricinfo Profile

1939 births
2013 deaths
Deaths from diabetes
Sri Lankan Test cricket umpires
Sri Lankan One Day International cricket umpires
Sri Lankan Tamil sportspeople